Erald Elmazi (born 18 March 1988) is an Albanian football player, who most recently played as a defender for  KF Himara.

External links
 

1988 births
Living people
Albanian footballers
Association football defenders
KF Apolonia Fier players
KS Lushnja players
KF Himara players